Kaare Norge (born 1963) is a Danish classical guitarist.

In 1991 he became the first classical musician to play at the Roskilde Festival.
Although he has recorded a very broad repertory of classical works, well known for his recitals of composers such as Chopin and Bach, he has received the most international attention for the arrangement of Led Zeppelin's Stairway to Heaven which he recorded on his 1994 CD La Guitarra.

Discography
 1991 - Tango
 1992 - Con Amore
 1993 - Bach, Rodrigo, Paganini
 1994 - La Guitarra
 1996 - Movements
 1996 - Guitar Player
 1998 - Made of Dreams (with Claus Raahauge)
 1998 - Morning Has Broken
 1998 - Classic
 1999 - Christmas
 2000 - La Cumparsita
 2001 - A Mi Amor
 2002 - Guitarra La Classica
 2003 - Here Comes the Sun
 2004 - Silence of the Spanish Guitar
 2005 - Recital
 2006 - Fantasia
 2006 - Portrait of an artist (DVD-video, produced and filmed by Jesper Brinck)
 2009 - Viva La Musica
 2011 - Beatles from My Heart
 2011 - Denmark
 2013 - Fiesta
 2015 - The Song The Melody – Carl Nielsen
 2018 - Variation
 2021 - Amoroso

References

External links
Kaare Norge's official homepage

1963 births
Danish classical guitarists
Living people